Conejos County is a county located in the U.S. state of Colorado. As of the 2020 census, the population was 7,461. The county seat is the unincorporated community of Conejos.

Being 50.7% Hispanic in 2020, Conejos was Colorado's largest Hispanic-majority county.

History
The first European known to visit this area was Juan de Oñate y Salazar in 1550 followed by  Don Diego de Vargas in 1694, but he left behind no colonists. In 1708, Juan de Uribarri passed through searching for run-away Indian slaves.

Conejos County was one of the original 17 counties created by the General Assembly of the Territory of Colorado on 1851-11-01. Conejos County was originally named Guadalupe County but was renamed Conejos County a week later on November 7. Its name comes from the Spanish word "conejo", meaning rabbit, for the abundance of rabbits in the area. Also early in its existence, the county seat was moved from the town of Guadalupe to Conejos. The original boundaries of the county included a large portion of southwestern Colorado.

In 1874, most of the western and northern portions of the county were broken away to form parts of Hinsdale, La Plata and Rio Grande counties, and Conejos County achieved its modern borders in 1885 when its western half was taken to create Archuleta County.

Religious history
The community of Conejos is the location of the oldest extant church house in Colorado, constructed in 1856 and named "Our Lady of Guadalupe Parish".  The first settlers into the area were from New Mexico, primarily from Abiquiu, San Juan de los Caballeros and Santa Cruz. As more people arrived, mission churches were set up and all had the records housed in Our Lady of Guadalupe Parish.

When the neighboring town of Antonito was built, the Theatines, priests from Spain, came into the area and built St. Augustine church in 1880 within Antonito. The church records from Our Lady of Guadalupe Parish are now housed at the church offices of Saint Augustine. Conejos is approximately a mile northwest of Antonito.

Presbyterians came into Conejos County in 1880 establishing churches in Antonito, Alamosa, Cenicero, Del Norte, Mogote, San Rafael, and Monte Vista. They also established schools in the area and had a large number of Hispanic converts. A jacal went up in 1854 in Guadalupe, now known as Conejos, which was the beginning of Our Lady of Guadalupe Parish.

There is also a large Mormon population within Conejos County. Settlers  belonging to the Church of Jesus Christ of Latter-day Saints (LDS Church) began settling in the towns of La Jara, Manassa and Sanford; each town currently has an LDS meetinghouse. Fox Creek, a village approximately 11 miles west of Antonito, is the newest community to have an LDS meetinghouse erected, although there had previously been a meetinghouse there. Fox Creek, however, does not have a predominantly Mormon population.

Genealogy
Records available for this area are marriage records, which are held by the county clerk. Divorce records are maintained by the clerk of the district court. Agencies that hold records for marriages and divorces from 1900 to 1939 are the Colorado State Archives and Denver Public Library Genealogy Department. Other records available are marriage records from 1871 and death records from 1877 to 1907. This also include land records from 1871, probate records from 1875, and court records from 1877. However, some records were lost due to a fire, but birth records for 1877-1907 are still preserved. Websites that will be of use when doing genealogical research are The Colorado Genealogical Society and Conejos County WW II Enlistments.

Amendment 64
When Colorado Amendment 64 was being voted into effect by Coloradans, Conejos County residents voted against approving the measure to legalize and regulate recreational Marijuana consumption and possession for those 21 or older; Conejos residents simultaneously voted for a Democratic president in the 2008 and 2012 presidential elections, making Conejos county the only Colorado county with the distinction of leaning liberal with the 2008 and 2012 presidential picks while leaning conservative with regard to marijuana policy.

Geography

Conejos County is in a broad high mountain valley in South Central Colorado.

Conejos County is situated with the National Forest to the west and the Rio Grande to the east, along Colorado's southern border with the state of New Mexico. Only about 34 percent of Conejos County is privately owned with the other 66 percent being National Forest, Bureau of Land Management (BLM) or State owned lands.

Climate
In winter, the average temperature is 21.6 degrees Fahrenheit, and the average daily minimum temperature is 4 degrees. In summer, the average temperature is 61.4 degrees, and the average maximum temperature is 79.6 degrees.

Seventy-one percent of the annual precipitation falls in the months of April through September. Average seasonal snowfall is 28 inches. The average relative humidity in mid-afternoon in spring is less than 35 percent; during the rest of the year, it is about 45 percent. The percentage of possible sunshine is 77 in the summer and 73 in the winter.

Adjacent counties
Rio Grande County - north
Alamosa County - northeast
Costilla County - east
Taos County, New Mexico - southeast
Rio Arriba County, New Mexico - south
Archuleta County- west

Major Highways
  U.S. Highway 285
  State Highway 15
  State Highway 17
  State Highway 136
  State Highway 142
  State Highway 368
  State Highway 371

National protected areas
 Rio Grande National Forest
 San Juan National Forest
 South San Juan Wilderness
 Rio Grande Natural Area

Historic trails and sites
 Old Spanish National Historic Trail
 Pike's Stockade, which is a National Historic Landmark

Scenic trails and byways
 Continental Divide National Scenic Trail
 Los Caminos Antiguos Scenic & Historic Byway

Demographics

As of the census of 2000, there were 8,400 people, 2,980 households, and 2,211 families residing in the county. The population density was 6 people per square mile (3/km2). There were 3,886 housing units at an average density of 3 per square mile (1/km2). The racial makeup of the county was 72.76% White, 0.21% Black or African American, 1.69% Native American, 0.15% Asian, 0.07% Pacific Islander, 21.50% from other races, and 3.61% from two or more races. 58.92% of the population were Hispanic or Latino of any race.

There were 2,980 households, out of which 38.50% had children under the age of 18 living with them, 56.30% were married couples living together, 12.70% had a female householder with no husband present, and 25.80% were non-families. 23.70% of all households were made up of individuals, and 11.50% had someone living alone who was 65 years of age or older. The average household size was 2.80 and the average family size was 3.33.

In the county, the population was spread out, with 32.10% under the age of 18, 8.50% from 18 to 24, 23.60% from 25 to 44, 20.80% from 45 to 64, and 15.00% who were 65 years of age or older. The median age was 34 years. For every 100 females there were 98.50 males. For every 100 females age 18 and over, there were 98.10 males.

The median income for a household in the county was $24,744, and the median income for a family was $29,066. Males had a median income of $26,351 versus $20,200 for females. The per capita income for the county was $12,050. About 18.60% of families and 23.00% of the population were below the poverty line, including 28.20% of those under age 18 and 17.30% of those age 65 or over.

Politics

Communities

Towns
 Antonito
 La Jara
 Manassa
 Romeo
 Sanford

Census-designated places
 Capulin
 Conejos

Other communities

 Bear Creek
 Bountiful
 Cañon
 Carmel
 Cenicero a.k.a. Lobatos
 Elk Creek
 Fox Creek
 Guadalupe
 Horca
 La Florida
 La Isla
 Los Sauses a.k.a. Lasauses, Colorado
 Las Mesitas
 Mogote
 Ortiz
 Osier
 Platoro
 Richfield
 Rincones
 San Antonio
 Sheep Creek

Notable people
Fred Haberlein - Muralist

Jack Dempsey - Famous boxer born in Manassa Colorado

See also

Outline of Colorado
Index of Colorado-related articles
Guadalupe County, Colorado Territory
National Register of Historic Places listings in Conejos County, Colorado

References

External links
 Conejos County Official Website
 Conejos County Government

 

 
Colorado counties
San Luis Valley of Colorado
1861 establishments in Colorado Territory
Populated places established in 1861